Paramount Music is an American record label. It serves as the in-house label for film and television music across all divisions of Paramount Pictures.

Soundtracks

See also
 List of record labels
 Paramount Records (1969)
 Famous Music

References

External links
Official website

American record labels
Paramount Pictures
Soundtrack record labels